Nelly Montiel (1919–1951) was an Argentine film actress. Having made her debut in Argentine films, Montiel moved to Mexico which had the largest Spanish-speaking film industry in the world.

She died in a car accident at the age of thirty two.

Selected filmography
 The Associate (1946)
 The Golden Barge (1947)
 Tender Pumpkins (1949)

References

Bibliography
 Adrián Pérez Melgosa. Cinema and Inter-American Relations: Tracking Transnational Affect. Routledge, 2012.

External links

1919 births
1951 deaths
Argentine film actresses
Argentine emigrants to Mexico